Kentucky Route 98 (KY 98) is a  state highway in Kentucky that runs from Kentucky Route 100 in Scottsville to Kentucky Route 100 southwest of Fountain Run.

Route description
KY 98 begins in downtown Scottsville intersecting KY 100. It intersects KY 1855 at Maynard and then traverses the southernmost part of Barren River Lake before intersecting KY 921. It ends approximately  into Monroe County at another intersection with KY 100 just west of Fountain Run.

Major intersections

References

0098
Transportation in Allen County, Kentucky
Transportation in Monroe County, Kentucky